The Alvis 10/30 is a car introduced by British car maker Alvis Car and Engineering Company Ltd in 1920.  It was the company's first production vehicle and was made until 1923. A range of body styles was available.

The car is powered by a water cooled, four cylinder 1460 cc four cylinder engine usually of the side valve type but some had overhead valves. The engine had a bore of 68mm and a stroke of 100mm. A Solex carburettor was used. This drove the rear wheels via a cone clutch and four speed gearbox.  The chassis had rigid axles and half elliptic springs.

On the home market the car cost £450 in chassis form up to £470 with factory body.

Alvis 11/40
In 1921 the car could be ordered with a larger 1598cc engine as the Alvis 11/40. The extra capacity was obtained by lengthening the stroke to 110mm. It was claimed to be able to reach .

54 were made.

Alvis 12/40

In 1922 the 11/40 was replaced by the 12/40 with the same engine but improved gearbox and rear axle. For the 1924 model year the 12/40 was designated 'TC', and for 1925 'TD'. The TD 12/40 was available with four-wheel brakes as an optional extra.

In 1923 the chassis cost £470 reducing to £375 in 1925.

It continued in production until Autumn 1925 by which time 1887 had been made.

References

10 30
Vehicles introduced in 1921